Walt Disney's Fun with Music is a record album by Walt Disney Productions, released in 1961.

Track listing

Side one
 Fun with Music
 Old MacDonald Had a Farm
 The Leprechaun with the Flute
 The House That Jack Built
 Annette
 The Little Cow
 Roy, Roy Quick on the Draw
 The Shoe Song
 When I Grow Up
 The Telephone Song
 The Pencil Song
 Get Busy
 Sho-Jo-Ji
 The British Grenadier
 Smile and Face the Music

Side two
 Hi to You
 The Boy at the Dike
 Alone at Coney Island
 The Friendly Farmer
 Cooking with Minnie Mouse
 Bon Jour Paree
 Do-Mi-So
 If You're Happy
 Old MacDonald Had a Tree
 Hey, Cubby Boy
 Banjo Joe
 Karen
 Schnitzelbank
 Rollin' Stone
 Good Samaritan

1961 albums
Walt Disney Records albums